The 149th General Assembly of the U.S. state of Georgia first met in 2007, succeeding the 148th General Assembly, and was the precedent of the 150th General Assembly in 2009.

Party standings

Senate

House of Representatives

Officers

Senate

Presiding Officer

Majority leadership

Minority leadership

House of Representatives

Presiding Officer

Majority leadership

Minority leadership

Members of the Georgia State Senate, 2007-2008

Members of the Georgia State House of Representatives, 2007-2008

External links

 Georgia General Assembly website
 2007-2008 Representatives by Name, District
 2007-2008 Senators by Name, District

Georgia (U.S. state) legislative sessions
Georgia General Assembly
Georgia General Assembly
General Assembly
General Assembly
Georgia 149
Georgia 149